In taxonomy, Methanothermus is a genus of microbes within Methanothermaceae. The species within this genes are hyperthermophiles and strictly anaerobic. They produce energy through the reduction of carbon dioxide with hydrogen to produce methane.  it is found in hydrothermal vents with temperatures as high as 85 °C and pH 6.5.

See also
 List of Archaea genera

References

Further reading

Scientific journals

Scientific books

Scientific databases

External links

Archaea genera
Euryarchaeota
Extremophiles